Desmond Michael Bane (born June 25, 1998) is an American professional basketball player for the Memphis Grizzlies of the National Basketball Association (NBA). He played college basketball for the TCU Horned Frogs.

Early life
After he was born, Bane, his mother Marissa, and his sister often moved around. When he was two years old, he started living with his great-grandparents, who raised him in Richmond, Indiana, for the rest of his childhood. At age 13, Bane discovered that his father, Etieno Ekiko, lived in Nigeria. Growing up, he found more success in baseball than in basketball but preferred the latter sport. Bane focused on baseball until eighth grade, with his great-grandfather coaching at the youth level, and also played football and soccer.

High school career
Bane played basketball for Seton Catholic High School, a small private school in Richmond, Indiana. He was drawn to the school because it appointed Josh Jurgens, who coached him in third grade, as head basketball coach during his eighth-grade season. As a senior, Bane averaged a state-high 30 points, 11.5 rebounds, 6.1 assists and 3.2 blocks per game. He scored a school-record 62 points and nine three-pointers in a win over Lincoln Senior High School. He was named MVP of the Wettig Memorial Holiday Tournament. Bane scored 1,991 points over his four-year career, surpassing 1988 Indiana Mr. Basketball winner Woody Austin for the most in Wayne County history. He did not receive an NCAA Division I offer until his senior season, when Furman offered him at the end of November early signing period. On May 12, 2016, Bane committed to play college basketball for TCU. He was not rated by major recruiting services 247Sports, ESPN, or Rivals.

College career

Bane earned Big 12 Newcomer of the Week honors after scoring 18 points and pulling down seven rebounds against Bradley. He had 16 points including three free throws with two seconds remaining to help TCU defeat number one-ranked Kansas, 85–82, in the quarterfinals of the Phillips 66 Big 12 Championship. Bane helped TCU win the NIT as a freshman, contributing nine points in the title game against Georgia Tech. He averaged 7.1 points and 2.9 rebounds per game and making 13 starts. In an 89–83 victory over Iowa State, Bane scored a season-high 27 points. As a sophomore, Bane averaged 12.5 points and 4.1 rebounds per game and his 47.2% 3-point percentage led the Big 12. In the NCAA Tournament, Bane had five points, four rebounds, four assists, a steal, and a block in the first-round loss to Syracuse. As a junior, Bane was named to the Second Team All-Big 12. He had a career-high 34 points in the team's regular-season finale against Texas and scored 30 points versus Nebraska in the second round of the NIT. Bane averaged 15.2 points per game to lead the team, 5.7 rebounds per game and shot 42.5% from behind the arc. After the season, he "tested the waters" of the NBA draft but returned to TCU. As a senior, Bane was named to the First Team All-Big 12. Bane averaged 16.6 points and 6.3 rebounds per game, and his 44.2% three-point percentage led the Big 12. On March 2, 2020, Bane was named Big 12 player of the week after scoring 23 points in a 75–72 upset over second-ranked Baylor.

Professional career

Memphis Grizzlies (2020–present)
Bane was selected with the 30th pick in the 2020 NBA draft by the Boston Celtics. He became the first TCU player to be picked in the first round since 1995. Bane was subsequently traded to the Memphis Grizzlies for a future pick. On November 25, 2020, the Grizzlies announced that they had signed Bane. Bane was selected to the NBA All-Rookie Second Team after his rookie season. He had the highest three point field goal percentage in a rookie season since Stephen Curry (minimum 150 attempts).

On December 5, 2021, Bane scored a then career-high 29 points and had nine rebounds in a 97–90 win over the Dallas Mavericks. Bane and Tyrese Haliburton were the winners of the Clorox Clutch Challenge at the 2022 NBA All Star Weekend. On March 23, 2022, Bane set the Grizzlies' franchise record for three-pointers made in a season, surpassing Mike Miller's record set in 2007 (202).

In the first round of the 2022 NBA playoffs while facing the Minnesota Timberwolves, on April 22, Bane led Memphis in scoring with 34 points during a 119–118 Game 4 loss. On April 30, Bane scored 23 points to help the Grizzlies eliminate the Timberwolves and reach the second round of the playoffs. Bane made 27 3-pointers in the series and set a new record for most 3-pointers in team history during a single postseason. The Grizzlies were eventually eliminated in six games during the second round by the Golden State Warriors, who went on to win the NBA Finals.

On October 24, 2022, Bane scored a career-high 38 points in a 134–124 win over the Brooklyn Nets. On November 11, during a 114–103 win over the Minnesota Timberwolves, he suffered a right foot injury. Three days later, the Grizzlies announced that Bane was diagnosed with a Grade 2 sprain of his right big toe and would be re-evaluated in 2-to-3 weeks. On December 7, the Grizzlies announced that Bane was ruled out for another three-to-four weeks with the injury. However, he made his return ahead of schedule on December 24, recording 17 points, three rebounds and two assists in a 125–100 win over the Phoenix Suns.

Career statistics

NBA

Regular season

|-
| style="text-align:left;"| 
| style="text-align:left;"| Memphis
| 68 || 17 || 22.3 || .469 || .432 || .816 || 3.1 || 1.7 || .6 || .2 || 9.2
|- 
| style="text-align:left;"|
| style="text-align:left;"|Memphis
| 76 || 76 || 29.8 || .461 || .436 || .903 || 4.4 || 2.7 || 1.2 || .4 || 18.2
|- class="sortbottom"
| style="text-align:center;" colspan="2"| Career
| 144 || 93 || 26.3 || .464 || .435 || .882 || 3.8 || 2.3 || .9 || .3 || 14.0

Playoffs

|-
| style="text-align:left;"| 2021
| style="text-align:left;"| Memphis
| 5 || 0 || 19.8 || .579 || .500 || — || 3.4 || 2.0 || .8 || .4 || 5.6
|-
| style="text-align:left;"| 2022
| style="text-align:left;"| Memphis
| 12 || 12 || 35.7 || .478 || .489 || .857 || 3.8 || 2.2 || .9 || .8 || 18.8
|- class="sortbottom"
| style="text-align:center;" colspan="2"| Career
| 17 || 12 || 31.0 || .489 || .490 || .857 || 3.6 || 2.1 || .9 || .6 || 14.9

College

|-
| style="text-align:left;"| 2016–17
| style="text-align:left;"| TCU
| 39 || 13 || 20.7 || .515 || .380 || .768 || 2.9 || 1.0 || .3 || .2 || 7.1
|-
| style="text-align:left;"| 2017–18
| style="text-align:left;"| TCU
| 33 || 32 || 30.5 || .539 || .461 || .780 || 4.1 || 2.5 || .9 || .2 || 12.5
|-
| style="text-align:left;"| 2018–19
| style="text-align:left;"| TCU
| 37 || 37 || 35.5 || .502 || .425 || .867 || 5.7 || 2.4 || 1.1 || .5 || 15.2
|-
| style="text-align:left;"| 2019–20
| style="text-align:left;"| TCU
| 32 || 32 || 36.0 || .452 || .442 || .789 || 6.3 || 3.9 || 1.5 || .5 || 16.6
|- class="sortbottom"
| style="text-align:center;" colspan="2"| Career
| 141 || 114 || 30.3 || .495 || .433 || .801 || 4.7 || 2.4 || .9 || .4 || 12.7

Personal life 
Bane is a devout Catholic.

References

External links
TCU Horned Frogs bio
USA Basketball bio

1998 births
Living people
African-American basketball players
African-American Catholics
American men's basketball players
American sportspeople of Nigerian descent
Basketball players from Indiana
Boston Celtics draft picks
Catholics from Indiana
Memphis Grizzlies players
Shooting guards
Sportspeople from Richmond, Indiana
TCU Horned Frogs men's basketball players
21st-century African-American sportspeople